Stephen Willard (born 27 August 1958 in Swindon) is a former professional English darts player. Who played in Professional Darts Corporation events.

He won a PDC Tour Card in 2015, which was the year he also won the Saints Open defeating Gary Stafford of England.

References

External links 
Profile and stats on Darts Database

1958 births
Living people
English darts players
People from Wiltshire
People from Swindon
Professional Darts Corporation former tour card holders